Aníbal Muñoz Duque  (3 October 1908 – 15 January 1987) was a Roman Catholic Cardinal and Archbishop of Bogotá.

Biography
He was born in Santa Rosa de Osos, Colombia as the son of José María Muñoz and Ana Rosa Duque. He was educated at the Seminary of Santa Rosa de Osos. He was ordained to the priesthood 19 November 1933. After his ordaination he was a faculty member and prefect of the Minor Seminary of the Institute of Missions of Yarumal from 1933 until 1937. He was then promoted to rector and vice-superior general of the Institute of Yarumal. In 1950 he was Pro-vicar general of the diocese of Santa Rosa de Osos until 1951.

Episcopate
Pope Pius XII appointed him Bishop of Socorro y San Gil on 8 April 1951. He was consecrated on 27 May by the Nuncio to Colombia. He was transferred to the diocese of Bucaramanga on 18 December 1952. He served there until he was promoted to the metropolitan see of Nueva Pamplona on 3 August 1959. He attended the Second Vatican Council in Rome. He was elected President of the Episcopal conference of Colombia in 1964, serving until 1972. He was appointed apostolic administrator of the archdiocese of Bogotá on 15 April 1967 and transferred to the titular see of Cariana on 30 March 1968. He hosted the visit of Pope Paul VI to Bogotá in August 1968 on the occasion of the 39th International Eucharistic Congress; it was the first papal visit to Latin America. He was named Coadjutor Archbishop of Bogotá on 2 February 1969. He succeeded to the archdiocese of Bogotá on 29 July 1972. He was named the military vicar of Colombia the next day.

Cardinalate
He was created and proclaimed Cardinal-Priest of San Bartolomeo all'Isola in the consistory of 5 March 1973 by Pope Paul.  He took part in the conclaves that elected Pope John Paul I and Pope John Paul II in August and October.  He resigned the pastoral government of the archdiocese of Bogotá on 25 June 1984. He died in 1987.  He is buried in the Santa Fe De Bogota Cathedral near the chapel of El Sagrario.

See also

References

1908 births
1987 deaths
People from Antioquia Department
Roman Catholic archbishops of Bogotá
20th-century Roman Catholic archbishops in Colombia
Colombian cardinals
Participants in the Second Vatican Council
Cardinals created by Pope Paul VI
Burials at the Primatial Cathedral of Bogotá
Roman Catholic bishops of Socorro y San Gil
Roman Catholic bishops of Bucaramanga
Roman Catholic archbishops of Nueva Pamplona